MTPD may refer to:
Maximum tolerable period of disruption, the maximum time that key products or services can be unavailable or undeliverable before stakeholders perceive unacceptable consequences
Metro Transit Police Department, the policing agency of the Washington Metropolitan Area Transit Authority (WMATA)
Mitochondrial trifunctional protein deficiency, an inherited fatty acid oxidation disorder.
Metric tonnes per day, a unit for capacity, i.e. of a chemical plant.